Giovanni di Cosimo I de' Medici (29 September 1543 – 20 November 1562), also known as Giovanni de' Medici the Younger, was an Italian cardinal.

Early years
He was born in Florence, the second son of Cosimo I de' Medici, Grand Duke of Tuscany, and Eleanor of Toledo. While his elder brother Francesco went on to a political and military career, Giovanni had reserved for him the ecclesiastical career.

He was the subject of two famous portraits by Bronzino, one as an infant and another of some years later, together with Eleonora of Toledo (although the subject of the latter has been identified also as Francesco or Garzia).

Aged only sixteen, after having already been made Archbishop of Pisa, Giovanni was created cardinal of Santa Maria in Domnica, by Pope Pius IV in the consistory of 31 January 1560.

Death
Probably already suffering from tuberculosis, Giovanni died  in Livorno two years after he was made a cardinal, from an  attack of malaria. His mother and his brother Garzia died of the same illness a few days after him.

Centuries after his death, a myth arose to the effect that Garzia had killed  Giovanni, following a dispute in 1562. In turn, their father Cosimo was supposed to have killed Garzia in a rage with his own sword. However, exhumations in 1857 showed no signs of violence on the bodies and it was concluded that they had both died of malaria in 1562.

Cosimo had another son in 1563 whom he also named Giovanni (he is best known as Don Giovanni de' Medici).

Ancestry

References

Sources
 Catholic Hierarchy (David M. Cheney): Giovanni di Cosimo I de' Medici
 FIU.edu (Florida International University): The Cardinals of the Holy Roman Church (Salvador Miranda) - MEDICI, iuniore, Giovanni de'
 Dizionario biografico degli italiani, vol. 73, Roma, Istituto dell'Enciclopedia Italiana, 2009 (Paola Volpini): MEDICI, Giovanni de'

1544 births
1562 deaths
Clergy from Florence
Giovanni
16th-century Italian cardinals
Roman Catholic archbishops of Pisa
16th-century Italian Roman Catholic archbishops
Deaths from malaria
Giovanni de' Medici (cardinal)
Burials at San Lorenzo, Florence
Nobility from Florence
Sons of monarchs